Scopula proximaria is a moth of the  family Geometridae. It is found in central China and Taiwan.

Subspecies
Scopula proximaria proximaria (China)
Scopula proximaria indigenata (Wileman, 1911) (Taiwan)

References

Moths described in 1897
proximaria
Moths of Asia
Moths of Taiwan